In music, Op. 167 stands for Opus number 167. Compositions that are assigned this number include:

 Raff – Symphony No. 4
 Reinecke – Undinesonate
 Saint-Saëns – Clarinet Sonata